The Tynedale Open Tournament was a grass court tennis tournament founded in 1881 as the Hexham Tournament and first staged at Priors Flat Grounds, Hexham, Northumberland, England.

History
The Hexham Tournament was an late 19th century tennis event first staged around August 1881 at Priors Flat Cricket Grounds, Hexham, Northumberland, England. The first winner of the men's singles was England's Jasper Gibson. The first tournament was  staged until 1885. In 1888 the Tynedale Lawn Tennis Club, and Tynedale Cricket Club were founded and staged events on the land leased by the Tyndale Athletic Association.  In 1890 a second Hexham tournament was revived as the Tynedale Open Tournament (allowing women's competitions) that was organised by the Tynedale Lawn Tennis Club. that event ran until 1931 before it was discontinued.

Location and Venue
Hexham is a market town and civil parish in Northumberland, England, on the south bank of the River Tyne, formed by the confluence of the North Tyne and the South Tyne at Warden nearby, and close to Hadrian's Wall. Hexham was the administrative centre for the Tynedale district.

Tennis first appeared in Hexham in the early 1880s as a cement court built in the Hexham Abbey grounds. Its success led to acquiring the leasehold of Prior's Flat with a contract to lay turf on the tennis courts. Tynedale Lawn Tennis Club’ itself was founded in 1888 and moved to its present-day location on Prior's Flat in 1889. Beginning in the 1940s through to the 1940s 3 hard (shale) tennis courts which were replaced by three tarmacadam courts in the late 1960s. In 1977 a new Tynedale Sports Club was created; merging the hockey, cricket and tennis sections as one sports club. In 2021 The Tyndale lawn Tennis Club changed its name to the Hexham Lawn Tennis Club.

Finals

Mens Singles
(incomplete roll)

Womens Singles
(incomplete roll)

References

Grass court tennis tournaments
Defunct tennis tournaments in the United Kingdom
Tennis tournaments in England